The 2011–12 Mestis season was the 12th season of the Mestis, the second level of ice hockey in Finland. 11 teams participated in the league, and Sport won the championship.

Standings

Playoffs

SM-Liiga promotion

Tampereen Ilves remained in the SM-Liiga.

Qualification

Play-outs
 LeKi - Peliitat 2:4

Qualification round

External links
 Official website

Fin
2011–12 in Finnish ice hockey
Mestis seasons